Hemichromis frempongi is a species of fish in the cichlid family. It is endemic to Lake Bosumtwi in Ghana. Its validity as a species is questionable, and some believe it should be included in the widespread H. fasciatus.

References

frempongi
Cichlid fish of Africa
Endemic freshwater fish of Ghana
Taxa named by Paul V. Loiselle
Fish described in 1979